Mystacomyoidea is a genus of parasitic flies in the family Tachinidae. There are at least two described species in Mystacomyoidea.

Species
These two species belong to the genus Mystacomyoidea:
 Mystacomyoidea mirabilis Thompson, 1963
 Mystacomyoidea spinosa Guimaraes, 1966

References

Further reading

 
 
 
 

Tachinidae
Articles created by Qbugbot